Birchwood Forest Park covers the area formerly occupied by the Royal Ordnance Factory, ROF Risley, in Birchwood, Warrington, in north-west England.

The park's history is tied directly to that of the district which it serves, Birchwood.

In the northern part of the park there is a ranger's cabin and various skateboarding and children's leisure facilities. The vast majority of the park's area is covered by large open spaces of grassland, commonly used for football and other outdoor sports.

The park is mainly surrounded by some inclines (the entrances to the Royal Ordnance Factory), and there is a lot of foliage. It is also a key area for outdoor events in Birchwood, with key events including the Birchwood Fireworks Display, the Birchwood Carnival, several Sunday-league football tournaments, and other sporting events.

In 1985, a sculpture entitled Bo Peep and Her Sheep, sculpted by Diane Gorvin  was introduced to the park.

References

External links
 Borough Council site for Birchwood Forest Park

Parks and commons in Warrington